Edwin J. Brady (December 6, 1889 – March 31, 1942) was an American film actor. He appeared in more than 350 films between 1911 and 1942. On Broadway, he appeared in The Spy (1913).

Filmography

The Heart of a Cracksman (1913)
 The Test (1914)
 A Child of the Prairie (1915) - The Gambler
 Neal of the Navy (1915) - Hernandez
 Spellbound (1916) - Katti Hab
 The Twin Triangle (1916) - Marco
 The Sultana (1916) - Count Strelitso
 The Mainspring (1916) - Jerviss
 The Double Room Mystery (1917) - Bill Greely
 God's Crucible (1917) - Wilkins
 Mutiny (1917) - Eben Wiggs
 The Flame of Youth (1917) - McCool
 The Reed Case (1917) - 'Red'
 The Stolen Paradise (1917) - Leroux
 The Spindle of Life (1917) - Jason
 Wild Sumac (1917) - John Lewisa
 Indiscreet Corinne (1917) - P.A. Britton
 The Learnin' of Jim Benton (1917) - Harvey Knowles
 The High Sign (1917) - Hugo Mackensen
 The Gun Woman (1918) - The Bostonian
 The Shoes That Danced (1918) - Wedge Barker
 Faith Endurin''' (1918) - Edward Crane
 Who Killed Walton? (1918) - Austin Booth
 Old Hartwell's Cub (1918) - Steve Marvin
 Everywoman's Husband (1918)
 Marked Cards (1918) - John Acton
 Beyond the Shadows (1918) - Horace Du Bois
 Wild Life (1918) - Steve Barton
 The Grey Parasol (1918) - Rodger Irwin
 Deuce Duncan (1918) - John
 Diane of the Green Van (1919)
 When Bearcat Went Dry (1919)
 The Kentucky Colonel (1920)
 Cheated Love (1921)
 The Silent Call (1921)
 The Rough Diamond (1921)
 The Kiss (1921)
 The Pride of Palomar (1922)
 To the Last Man (1923)
 Fools Highway (1924)
 The Dancing Cheat (1924)
 The Price She Paid (1924)
 Stolen Secrets (1924)
 Mantrap (1926)
 Whispering Canyon (1926)
 The Winning of Barbara Worth (1926)
 The Rose of Kildare (1927)
 Hoof Marks (1927)
 The King of Kings (1927)
 The Noose (1928)
 The Code of the Scarlet (1928)
 Alibi (1929)
 Thunderbolt (1929)
 The Virginian (1929)
 The Trespasser (1929)
 Dynamite (1929)
 City Girl (1930)
 The Texan (1930)
 Abraham Lincoln (1930)
 The Last of the Duanes (1930)
 The Spoilers (1930)
 Whoopee! (1930)
 An American Tragedy (1931)
 The Squaw Man (1931)
 Desert Vengeance (1931)
 Red-Headed Woman (1932)
 Forbidden Trail (1932)
 Destry Rides Again (1932)
 The Phantom President (1932)
 Frisco Jenny (1932)
 South of Santa Fe (1932)
 The Match King (1932)
 Oliver Twist (1933)
 Parachute Jumper (1933)
 One Sunday Afternoon (1933)
 Before Dawn (1933)
 Night Flight (1933)
 Penthouse (1933)
 Tillie and Gus (1933)
 Bombshell (1933) 
 Son of Kong (1933) 
 Spitfire (1934)
 George White's Scandals (1934)
 Treasure Island (1934)
 The Whole Town's Talking (1935) 
 Naughty Marietta (1935)
 Public Hero ﹟1 (1935)
 The Arizonian (1935)
 Klondike Annie (1936) 
 Sutter's Gold (1936) 
 Fury (1936) 
 Come and Get It (1936) 
 Conquest (1937)
 Wells Fargo (1937) 
 Riders of the Dawn (1937)
 In Old Chicago (1938)
 Marie Antoinette (1938)
 Little Miss Broadway (1938)
 The Texans (1938)
 If I Were King (1938)
 The Mad Miss Manton (1938)
 The Cowboy and the Lady (1938)
 The Buccaneer (1938)
 Blockade (1938)
 The Adventures of Huckleberry Finn (1939) 
 Stagecoach (1939)
 The Oklahoma Kid (1939)
 Union Pacific (1939)
 Rose of Washington Square (1939)
 Blackmail (1939)
 The Arizona Kid (1939)
 Frontier Marshal (1939)
 Tower of London (1939)
 The Invisible Man Returns (1940) 
 Abe Lincoln in Illinois (1940)
 Dark Command (1940)
 Forty Little Mothers (1940)
 Saps at Sea (1940)
 When the Daltons Rode (1940)
 North West Mounted Police (1940)
 Pot o' Gold (1941)
 Billy the Kid (1941)
 The Get-Away (1941)
 Honky Tonk (1941)
 Sullivan's Travels (1941)
 Reap the Wild Wind (1942)
 The Spoilers (1942)
 Tombstone, the Town Too Tough to Die (1942)
 In Old California (1942)
 Apache Trail (1942)
 The Forest Rangers'' (1942)

References

External links

1889 births
1942 deaths
20th-century American male actors
American male film actors
Male actors from New York City